Milicent Washburn Shinn (April 15, 1858 – August 13, 1940) was an author, editor, and child psychologist. She was the first woman to receive a doctorate from the University of California, Berkeley. She entered the State University in September 1874 and finished her undergraduate degree in 1880. She was one of three student speakers at the commencement. She edited the Overland Monthly from 1882 to 1894. She received her Ph.D. in 1898 at the age of 40.

Early life
Milicent Washburn Shinn was born on her parents' ranch at the mouth of Alameda Creek on April 15, 1858. She was the daughter of James Shinn and Lucy Ellen Clark. The ranch was between Centerville and Vallejo Mills. Some time after the Transcontinental Railroad came through Alameda Cañon (1869) and established Niles station, the area became the town of Niles, California (now a district of Fremont, California). Her father was a nurseryman and fruit rancher. He was involved in state horticultural, nurseryman, and agricultural organizations. Shinn was one of seven children, however, three of her siblings passed away at a young age and her sister Annie died as a young adult in 1878. Shinn's parents sent children Annie, Milicent, Joseph, and Charles Howard Shinn to the University of California, Berkeley, which had only started admitting women the year prior in 1873.

Her brother was a writer, teacher, inspector of the UC experiment stations, horticulturalist, and forest ranger. Her cousin Edmund Clark Sanford was a prominent psychologist. Shinn helped take care of her brother's daughter Ruth, who would coincidentally be the main focus of Shinn's studies. Shinn also cared for her brother's other three children, and frequently corresponded with her extended family.

Career
She was active as a writer, editor, scientist and research worker; she was the first woman to receive Ph. D. degree from University of California. Following her undergraduate graduation from the University of California, Berkeley, Shinn began work as an editor for the Overland Monthly. Her first published essay was "Thirty Miles" which depicted what she would see on her journey home to Niles. Shinn believed in the power of the press and thought that contributing to the literature of California would help aid in reducing the social woes that had arisen following the end of the American Civil War.Shinn is well known in the Psychology community for her published Doctoral Dissertation "Notes on the Development of a Child (1898)." Additionally, Shinn's personal observational work prior to her doctorate program, "The First Two Years of the Child" was considered the first of its kind. Her research focused specifically on observing the emotional and psychical health of her niece and her progression over the first two years of her life. This was the first extensive documentation of a child's upbringing and was thought to be incredibly valuable to the field of child psychology. Shinn was convinced by her companions to pursue a doctoral degree in child psychology, which led to her resignation from the Overland Monthly in 1894 and her return to the University of California, Berkeley as a doctoral candidate where she became the first woman ever to receive a Ph.D. from the University of California, Berkeley.

She was a member of the Society of Mayflower Descendants, the American Academy of Science, the Phi Beta Kappa, the American Eugenics Society, the Alumni Association of the University of California, the Prytanean Society, the Save the Redwoods League, the League of Nations Association.  She was on the advisory council of the Women's Congress Association of the Pacific Coast in 1895. She spoke about "Early Home Environment" at the conference. "To live in the country, to see birds flying and flowers growing and trees waving in the wind and great skies spreading above, to dig in the ground, to know some thing of the way God works his wonders in plant life; this seems to me the only real living for a little child."  She is listed in American men of science: a biographical directory. The New York Times reviewed her publications in 1908: "Miss Milicent Washburn Shinn has compiled in two volumes a series of Notes of the Development of a Child, the second volume of which, The Development of the Senses in the First Three Years of Childhood, has recently been published by the press of the University of California."

 The Overland Monthly 
The Overland Monthly, the newspaper Shinn joined at age 25, was based in California and produced its first series of works in the year 1868. The newspaper, which maintained the same ownership throughout its existence, changed titles over the years 1868 to1935. 

A dinner on December 22, 1882 relaunched the Overland Monthly under Shinn's editorship. It was held at Irving M. Scott’s house in San Francisco. Guests included Milicent Shinn, Prof. Kellog, W. W. Crane, Drs. Joseph  and John LeConte, John H. Carmany, Charles S. Greene, Ina Coolbrith, Prof. E. R. Sill, Prof. Bernard Moses, and others. The supplement to the first volume of the second series describes the dinner and includes speeches and letters.  The first issue of the second series has an overview of the years under Bret Harte, "Overland Reminiscences" of the year before the revival of the journal.   

In an article in the Overland Monthly, July 1898, Shinn reflected on her years as editor, 1883–1894. She talked about how the world's attention at the time was fixated on the Gold Rush that took place in California. Shinn corresponded with many famous people, like John Muir, while editor.

Personal life
She was a lifelong resident of California. Her life followed the path of academia, but family matters, described as the Family Claim, limited the amount of time she could invest in her personal aspirations and prompted Shinn to return home to act as a caretaker for her aging parents after receiving her Ph.D. Her father, James, died before Milicent received her PhD. Lucy Shinn died in 1915. Given this limitation, Shinn capitalized on her surroundings making Ruth the center of her work. There is no record of Shinn having any intimate relationships, and there is no record of her having any children of her own.

Lilian Bridgman designed Shinn's home that was located on her family's property in Niles in 1916 and finished in 1917. The home was moved to Peralta Road around 1958, because of gravel quarrying operations along Alameda Creek and possibly because of flooding and still exists today as a private home.

She lived at her home for a quarter of a century at Niles, California, where she died at the age of 82 in 1940. The New York Times published her obituary on August 15, 1940, two days after she died.

 Family claim controversy 
Women such as Millicent in the 1900s often experienced what scholars currently refer to as the family claim and sisterhood. These two concepts describe the household values held by the majority of families in North America during this time period. Females of all ages were understood to have an obligation to the family. This created a toxic environment that severely limited the social mobility of the individuals and limited the options for personal growth and expression. Scarborough and Furumoto used Shinn as an example of “the family claim”—the career limitations women faced in terms of their family obligations.

Despite the perceived notion that Shinn would be restrained by the family claim and her duty to her family, she was able to continue her work in the field of child psychology. Shinn did not let societal restrictions hold her back and pursued her efforts to collect data from her network of home-observers. Her network consisted of college-educated mothers who helped serve as observers of their own children which provided Shinn with much meaningful data. This unique approach to in-home data collection led Shinn to produce in 1907 her powerful piece titled The Development of the Senses in the First Three Years of Childhood. Influence on developmental psychology 
While German philosopher Dietrich Tiedemann is credited with writing the first baby biography in 1787, followed by a German biologist Wilhelm Preyer in 1882, Shinn published one of the most well-known baby biographies in the United States in 1900, based largely on her observations of her niece, Ruth. Shinn had what she described as, "the notebook habit from college and editorial days, and jotted things down as I watched, till quite unexpectedly I found myself in possession of a large mass of data." Her observations were delivered as a paper titled, "The First Two Years of the Child" which were presented at the World's Columbian Exposition in Chicago in 1893 where it was recognized as the first of its kind in the United States.

Shinn's focus on ontogenetic evolution was relatively new for her time and paved the way for more studies on infants since children were studied far more than infants in the 19th century. Shinn noted that, "Thus it has come to pass that while babies are born and grow up in every household, and while the gradual unfolding of their faculties has been watched with the keenest interest and intensest joy by intelligent and even scientific fathers and mother from time immemorial, yet very little has yet been done in the scientific study of this most important of all possible subjects-the ontogenetic evolution of the faculties of the human mind." It follows that Shinn enabled infant development to have since been studied in numerous unique contexts: medical correlates of infant development (Littman & Parmelee, 1978), the impact of postnatal depression on infant development (Murray, 1992), the development of infant-father relationships (Lamb, 1997), infant development of wariness of strangers (Sroufe, 1977), and in-depth books on general infant development like Joy Osofsky's (1987) handbook of infant development to name a few. Shinn's work also laid the foundation for Jean Piaget's child development research.

Shinn noted how practical intelligence appears around the middle of the first year of an infant's life, giving the example of how her niece first used her intelligence to place her toe into her mouth in a different motion than the one she used to put her rattle in her mouth. Thus, Shinn acted as a pioneer for other researchers like Bar-On and Parker (2000) and Sternberg and Grigorenko (2000) to study the development of practical intelligence. Causality research via experiments with infants such as Newman et al.'s (2008) study on the origins of causal perception and Yale University's habituation studies have also stemmed from Shinn's research.

Infant imitation was recognized by Shinn, laying the foundation for later studies such as Ryalls et al.'s (2020) research in which 14–18-month-old infants watched a peer or adult model complete a 3-step sequence and then demonstrated significant ability to imitate what they saw immediately and one week later, more successfully for the peer than adult condition.

Shinn also exemplified the beginnings of intercommunication by speech in Ruth when she stood behind Ruth and neutrally listed off different names until saying “Ruth” and noticing how she turned and looked at Shinn only when her name was spoken. Mandel et al. (1995) was able to expand on Shinn's name recognition observations by using a head-turn preference procedure. This procedure indicated that 4–5-month-old infants recognize the patterns of their names and can distinguish them from noises with both different and the same stress patterns.

Emotional dependence was another topic discussed by Shinn. She observed that Ruth grew anxious upon separation from her mother and would cry while being carried around corridors, stopping to see if her mother was around the corner, and continuing crying once she saw that she was not. Noting emotional dependence paved the way for studies about attachment types, for example, by Mikulincer and Nachshon (1991), and even the study of the neurobiology of infant attachment as discussed by Moriceau and Sullivan (2005).

 Works 
Milicent Shinn wrote using pseudonyms while writing for the Overland Monthly. She identified the names that she used as M.W.S., John Henry Barnabas, J. Burns, R. Moore, H. Shewin, Pauline Carsten Curtis. 
In a New England Graveyard (1880) The CalifornianThe Teachers at Farwell (May 1881) The CalifornianOut of Reach: A Camping Medley I, II (May 1882) The Californian author is H.U.C (Hard Up Club). The stories were based on a camping trip in 1881 from Niles to the coast. 
Out of Reach: A Camping Medley III (June 1882) The Californian author is H.U.C. 
Out of Reach: A Camping Medley IV (July 1882) The Californian author is H.U.C.
Verses in College Verses (1882) published by the Berkeleyan Stock Company, along with verses written by her sister, Annie Shinn, her brother, Charles Howard Shinn , and her cousin, Edmund Clark SanfordThe University of California (1883)End of an Era (1883)Summer Cañons (1883)
"Thirty miles". The Overland Monthly, I, 596-604 (1883).
"The Verse and Prose of H.H.", Overland Monthly (Sept. 1885)
"A Pioneer Fruit Region", Overland Monthly (July 1888) (under pen name J. Burns)
"Poverty and Charity in San Francisco," Overland Monthly (1889, p. 535-547)The Leland Stanford, Junior, University (1891)The Lick Astronomical Department of the University of California (1892)
"The University of California. The Lick Astronomical Department" appears in chapter X of the Magnetic astronomy of the Bible. Seven seals opened. The glory of God revealed in the sun, moon, planets and stars, by new application of magnetic force and power (1893)Notes on the development of a child (1893)
 Notes on the development of a child, 2 volumes, University of California Studies, (1893).Young Strong of the "Clarion" in Stories by American authors
"Some Comments on Babies", Overland monthly and the Out West magazine (1894)The Baby's Mind — A Study for College Women, 1894
The first two years of the child. In Proceedings of the International Congress of Education, Chicago, 1893. New York: National Education Association (1895).
"The marriage rate of college women", The Century, 1895, p.946-48.
 Notes on Children's Drawings (1897)
 The Biography Of A Baby (1900)
 Syllabi A to E 
 Syllabi F to H for mothers, F to H for teachersj
 Notes on the development of a child. II. The development of the senses in the first three years of childhood (1907)
 The Development of the Senses in the First Three Years of Childhood, (1908)
 Women Wants Ballot Men Won by War, Appeal to Farmers of State Asks Votes for All Alike, San Francisco Call (11 September 1911)Young Strong of the "Clarion" in Stories by American authors, 1911
Comments in Winning Equal Suffrage in California, 1912, p. 127-128; Condensed from leaflet to "Farmers and Fruit Growers," written for California Campaign.Biography of a Baby'' with intro by T. Berry Brazelton. (1985)

Overland Monthly Editor 
Shinn was editor of Overland Monthly from 1883 to 1894.

Correspondence 

 Daniel Coit Gilman

Archive locations 

 Bancroft Library at the University of California: Milicent Washburn Shinn papers, 1889-1935, Milicent Washburn Shinn papers, circa 1882-1906.
 Shinn House archives at Shinn Historical Park & Arboretum
 Washington Township Museum of Local History
 University of the Pacific, Letters to John Muir
 California Historical Society

Shinn Historical Park & Arboretum 
The park is owned by the city of Fremont, California and is the last 4 acres of Shinn's Nurseries and the Shinn Ranch. Three groups are active in the park. The Friends of Heirloom Flowers is the garden club that, since 1994, has taken care of the gardens around the historic Shinn House built in 1876, the Shinn Bungalow built around 1907, and the Sim Cottage built before 1856. The Mission Peak Heritage Foundation (MPHF) has managed the Shinn House and Shinn House Museum since 1972. The Chinese Bunkhouse Preservation Project is a subcommittee of the MPHF and was formed to preserve the last remaining building from the Shinn Ranch China Camp.

References

Sources

 

Milicent Shinn's papers are located at the University of California, with the archives for the Mission Peak Heritage Foundation, and at the Washington Township Museum of Local History.

External links 
 Christine von Oertzen: Science in the nursery: Milicent Shinn's observations of early childhood development, 1890 to 1910, article about Shinn and her work from the Max Planck Institute for the History of Science 2013 (in German, with English abstract)
 All 80 v. of Overland Monthly, including those edited by Shinn and those containing her publications at HathiTrust. Milicent Shinn edited the Overland Monthly from 1883 to 1894.
  The Shinn and Sanford families are buried in plot 13 at Mountain View Cemetery in Oakland, California.
Mission Peak Heritage Foundation manages the Shinn House and the Shinn House Museum at the Shinn Historical Park & Arboretum in the city of Fremont, California.
Friends of Heirloom Flowers takes care of two acres of the Shinn family's historic gardens and the 1983 Japanese garden, George Koomei Kato Memorial Garden.
The Chinese Bunkhouse Preservation Project at Shinn Historical Park & Arboretum

1858 births
1940 deaths
American women psychologists
University of California, Berkeley alumni
People from Fremont, California
People from Niles, California
19th-century American non-fiction writers
20th-century American non-fiction writers
19th-century American women writers
20th-century American women writers
American child psychologists